The 2013 Skycity Triple Crown was a motor race meeting for the Australasian sedan-based V8 Supercars. It was the sixth event of the 2013 International V8 Supercars Championship. Three races were held during the race meeting.

Jamie Whincup of Triple Eight Race Engineering continued his recent form by winning the 60/60 Sprint race on Saturday. His luck would turn on Sunday, however, with a drive-through penalty in the final race dropping him to nineteenth. David Reynolds, driving for Rod Nash Racing, showed good pace, taking two pole positions, though his best result would only be a third place in the third race. Ford Performance Racing's Mark Winterbottom scored his first win of the season in the second race while Whincup's team-mate Craig Lowndes won the third race.

The Holden Racing Team's James Courtney found form, taking a pole position and two podium finishes before retiring in the final race. The event also saw the best finishes for both Nissan and Mercedes-Benz, with Rick Kelly and Tim Slade finishing fifth and sixth respectively in the 60/60 Sprint race. German driver Maro Engel also scored his best result, with a ninth place in the third race, which was marred by a multi-car crash on the first lap which eliminated seven cars and caused the race to be shortened by eleven laps.

Championship standings after the race
 After 16 of 36 races.

Drivers' Championship standings

Teams' Championship standings

 Note: Only the top five positions are included for both sets of standings.

Darwin
Sport in Darwin, Northern Territory
2010s in the Northern Territory
Motorsport in the Northern Territory